= Phorieia =

Ancient Greek village

Phorieia (Ancient Greek: Φορίεια) was a village of ancient Arcadia mentioned by Stephanus of Byzantium.

Its site is unlocated.
